Lieutenant-Colonel Sir Francis Edward Fremantle, OBE, DL, FRCS, FRCP (29 May 1872 – 26 August 1943) was a British physician and Conservative Party politician who served as the Member of Parliament (MP) for St Albans from 1919 until his death.

Early life
F E Fremantle was the fourth son of the Very Rev. William Henry Fremantle, Dean of Ripon. Following education  at Eton College and Balliol College, Oxford, he went to study medicine at Guy's Hospital, London. He received his doctorate in 1898.

Medicine
In 1902 he was appointed county medical officer of health for Hertfordshire, a post he held until 1916. He was elected a fellow of the Royal College of Physicians in 1910, and subsequently served on the organisation's council. Fremantle held a commission as a surgeon-captain in the Hertfordshire Yeomanry, and served as a medical officer with the British Army in the Second Boer War. He then travelled to the Punjab, India to work as a plague medical officer from 1903 – 1904. During the First World War he rose to the rank of lieutenant-colonel in the Royal Army Medical Corps, serving in Mesopotamia.

Politics
After the war, Fremantle entered politics. In March 1919 he was elected to the London County Council as a Municipal Reform Party councillor for Dulwich. Later in the year, Hildred Carlile, the Conservative MP for St Albans, resigned from the House of Commons due to ill-health. Fremantle was selected as the Coalition Conservative candidate for the resulting by-election held in December, and was elected despite a strong challenge from the Labour Party.

Fremantle became a frequent speaker in parliament, being recognised as a spokesman for the medical profession, and was chairman of the Parliamentary Medical Committee from 1923 to 1943. He held the St Albans seat for the Conservatives until his death, and was knighted in 1932, for "political and public services". In 1926 he became a Deputy Lieutenant of Hertfordshire.

Marriage and death
In 1905 he married Dorothy Chinnery, and they had one son. He died suddenly at his home, Bedwell Park, near Hatfield in August 1943.

References

External links 
 

1872 births
1943 deaths
UK MPs 1918–1922
UK MPs 1922–1923
UK MPs 1923–1924
UK MPs 1924–1929
UK MPs 1929–1931
UK MPs 1931–1935
UK MPs 1935–1945
Alumni of Balliol College, Oxford
People educated at Eton College
Conservative Party (UK) MPs for English constituencies
Members of London County Council
Royal Army Medical Corps officers
Deputy Lieutenants of Hertfordshire
Fellows of the Royal College of Physicians
Fellows of the Royal College of Surgeons
Hertfordshire Yeomanry officers
Municipal Reform Party politicians